The 1933 Ball State Cardinals football team was an American football team that represented Ball State Teachers College (later renamed Ball State University) in the Indiana Intercollegiate Conference (IIC) during the 1933 college football season. In their fourth season under head coach Lawrence McPhee, the Cardinals compiled a 1–6–1 record (overall and in conference), finished in 14th place out of 15 teams in the IIC, and were outscored by a total of 90 to 20. The team played its home games at Ball State Field in Muncie, Indiana.

Schedule

References

Ball State
Ball State Cardinals football seasons
Ball State Cardinals football